Carl L. Garrett (August 31, 1947 – August 24, 2020) was an American football running back who began his professional career with the American Football League's Boston Patriots.

Carl Garrett caught 29 passes for 267 yards and two touchdowns in 1969, and ran the ball for over five yards per carry with 137 attempts for 691 yards and five touchdowns. He was the 1969 Sporting News ' AFL Rookie of the Year. He was also selected to the AFL All-Star team in 1969.

Garrett was involved in a highly unusual trade just prior to the 1971 season.  The Patriots traded Garrett to the Dallas Cowboys for running back Duane Thomas.  Shortly after the players reported to their new teams, the trade was rescinded, and Thomas returned to the Cowboys and Garrett to the Patriots.  The Cowboys ultimately won the Super Bowl at the end of the 1971 season with Duane Thomas as their leading rusher in the game.

See also
List of American Football League players

External links
 Stats
 Patriots bio page
 Jets bio page
 Carl Garrett dies

1947 births
2020 deaths
Sportspeople from Denton, Texas
Players of American football from Texas
American football halfbacks
New Mexico Highlands Cowboys football players
American Football League Rookies of the Year
American Football League All-Star players
Boston Patriots players
New England Patriots players
Chicago Bears players
New York Jets players
Oakland Raiders players
American Football League players